The Gaming Hall of Fame was established in 1989 to recognize individuals who have played a significant role in the gaming-entertainment industry.

The Gaming Hall of Fame Charity Gala is an annual event organized by the American Gaming Association (AGA) and its members to honor achievements in industry leadership and entertainment. Induction into the Gaming Hall of Fame is the highest honor accorded by the gaming-entertainment industry.  Each year, individuals who have distinguished themselves through significant contributions to the industry receive this distinction.  More than 80 people have been inducted into the Gaming Hall of Fame since its inception in 1989.

The Gaming Hall of Fame Charity Dinner and Induction Ceremony is organized by the AGA and its members and benefits the National Center for Responsible Gaming.

Notable inductees
Notable people who have been inducted into the Hall of Fame are listed below, with their year of induction.

Sheldon Adelson – Chairman of Las Vegas Sands (2011)
Paul Anka – Singer at casinos (2001)
Bob Arum – Boxing promoter (2008)
Bill Bennett – Cofounder of Circus Circus Enterprises, owner of the Sahara Hotel and Casino (1990)
Fred Benninger – Chairman of Metro-Goldwyn-Mayer and MGM Grand, Inc. (2004)
Lyle Berman – Cofounder of Grand Casinos (2016)
Benny Binion – Owner of Binion's Horseshoe, founder of the World Series of Poker (1990)
Jack Binion – Founder of Horseshoe Gaming (2004)
Jan Jones Blackhurst – Mayor of Las Vegas, executive at Caesars Entertainment (2014)
Blue Man Group – Performance artists at Las Vegas casinos (2011)
Sam Boyd – Cofounder of Boyd Gaming (1991)
David Copperfield – Magician at casinos (2007)
Celine Dion – Singer at Caesars Palace (2013)
Franco Dragone – Director of Cirque du Soleil shows and Le Rêve (2006)
William R. Eadington – Academic who studied the gaming industry (2011)
Jack Entratter – Executive at the Sands Hotel (1999)
Frank Fahrenkopf – Founder of the American Gaming Association (2013)
Jackie Gaughan – Owner of several casinos in Downtown Las Vegas (1990)
Michael Gaughan – Founder of Coast Casinos (2009)
Henry Gluck – Chairman of Caesars World (1993)
Bernard Goldstein – Founder of Isle of Capri Casinos, "father of riverboat gaming" (2008)
Merv Griffin – Owner of Resorts International, investor in Players International (2002)
William Harrah – Developer of Harrah's Reno and Harrah's Lake Tahoe (1989)
Richard A. "Skip" Hayward  – Led effort to gain recognition for the Mashantucket Pequot Tribe, enabling the development of Foxwoods Resort Casino (2016)
Barron Hilton – President of Hilton Hotels (1990)
Jeremy Jacobs – Chairman of Delaware North (2021)
Tom Jones – Singer at casinos (2003)
Don King – Boxing promoter (2008)
Kirk Kerkorian – Founder of MGM Resorts International, developer of the International Hotel and MGM Grand Hotel and Casino (1991)
Sol Kerzner – Developer of casinos in South Africa and at Paradise Island (1991)
Emeril Lagasse – Restaurateur at casinos (2008)
Guy Laliberté – Founder of Cirque du Soleil (2012)
J. Terrence Lanni – Chairman of MGM Mirage, executive of Caesars World (2000)
Don Laughlin – Namesake of Laughlin, Nevada, developer of the Riverside Resort Hotel & Casino (1991)
Steve Lawrence & Eydie Gorme – Singers at casinos (1999)
Gary Loveman – CEO of Caesars Entertainment (2013)
Michael Mina – Restaurateur at Las Vegas casinos (2007)
Craig H. Neilsen – Founder of Ameristar Casinos (2005)
Wayne Newton – Singer at casinos (2000)
Charlie Palmer – Restaurateur at Nevada casinos (2011)
Clifford Perlman – CEO of Caesars World (2007)
Steven Perskie – New Jersey state legislator, led effort to legalize casinos in Atlantic City (2018)
Wolfgang Puck – Restaurateur at casinos (2005)
William Raggio – United States Senator from Nevada (2012)
Harry Reid – United States Senator from Nevada, chairman of the Nevada Gaming Commission (2001)
William "Si" Redd – Founder of International Game Technology (1991)
Debbie Reynolds – Singer at casinos (2005)
Don Rickles – Comedian at casinos (2004)
Larry Ruvo – Liquor distributor in Las Vegas, philanthropist (2005)
Jay Sarno – Developer of Caesars Palace and Circus Circus Las Vegas (1989)
Guy Savoy – Restaurateur at Caesars Palace (2013)
Grant Sawyer – Governor of Nevada, influential in development of gaming regulations (1989)
Julian Serrano – Restaurateur at Las Vegas casinos (2012)
Siegfried & Roy – Magicians at casinos (1998)
Frank Sinatra – Singer at casinos (1997)
Alex Stratta – Restaurateur at Las Vegas casinos (2006)
E. Parry Thomas – Banker who financed numerous casinos in Las Vegas (1989)
Donald Trump – Developer of casinos in Atlantic City and Indiana (1995)
Thomas Young, Sr. – Founder of Young Electric Sign Company (1998)
Del Webb – Builder and owner of several casinos in Las Vegas and Atlantic City (2000)
Elaine Wynn – Director of Mirage Resorts and Wynn Resorts, philanthropist (1999)
Steve Wynn – Chairman of Mirage Resorts, founder of Wynn Resorts (2006)

Notes

External links

Gambling in the United States
Halls of fame in Washington, D.C.
Entertainment halls of fame
Awards established in 1989